United Nations Security Council resolution 493, adopted on 23 November 1981, considered a report by the Secretary-General regarding the United Nations Disengagement Observer Force.  The Council noted its efforts to establish a durable and just peace in the Middle East but also expressed its concern over the prevailing state of tension in the area.

The resolution decided to call upon the parties concerned to immediately implement Resolution 338 (1973), it renewed the mandate of the Observer Force for another six months until 31 May 1982 and requested that the Secretary-General submit a report on the situation at the end of that period.

The resolution was adopted with 14 votes to none; China did not participate in the voting.

See also
 Arab–Israeli conflict
 Golan Heights
 Israel–Syria relations
 List of United Nations Security Council Resolutions 401 to 500 (1976–1982)

References
Text of the Resolution at undocs.org

External links
 

 0493
 0493
 0493
Israel–Syria relations
Middle East peace efforts
 0493
1981 in Israel
1981 in Syria
November 1981 events